Riaucourt is a commune in the Haute-Marne department in north-eastern France. It is most notable for a castle that dates back to 1294.

See also
Communes of the Haute-Marne department

References

Communes of Haute-Marne